The 1995 Bracknell Forest Borough Council election took place on 4 May 1995, to elect all 40 members in 19 wards for Bracknell Forest Borough Council in England.  The election was held on the same day as other local elections in England & Wales as part of the 1995 United Kingdom local elections.  For the first time since 1973, the Labour Party won control of the council, decimating the Conservative Party to less than half the seats it won in 1991, with the Conservative group leader losing his seat in Great Hollands South.

Ward results
An asterisk (*) denotes an incumbent councillor standing for re-election

Ascot

Binfield

Bullbrook

College Town

Cranbourne

Crowthorne

Garth

Great Hollands North

Great Hollands South

Hanworth

Harmanswater

Little Sandhurst

Old Bracknell

Owlsmoor

Priestwood

Sandhurst

St. Marys

Warfield

Wildridings

Footnotes

References

Bracknell Forest Borough Council elections
Bracknell